Jamiel Ali (19 March 1941 – 30 October 1998) was a Trinidadian cricketer. He played fifteen first-class matches for Trinidad and Tobago between 1960/61 and 1975/76.

References

External links
 

1941 births
1998 deaths
Trinidad and Tobago cricketers